The 1999 Women's World Floorball Championships was the second world championship in women's floorball. The games were played in Borlänge, Sweden 9–15 May 1999. Finland won the tournament defeating Switzerland, 5-1, in the final-game and it was their first title. This also was the first time that the world championships were divided into two separate divisions, although all games were played at the same dates in Borlänge. Sweden won the bronze medals defeating Norway, 5-1, in the bronze medal game.

Australia, Denmark & Singapore made their first appearances in the women's floorball world championships.

Division A

Results
Originally there were planned to be two groups consisting of four teams each, but because of a withdrawal from Russia group A dropped to three teams. The two best placed teams in each group advance to play semifinals while the third best teams went to play the game for 5th place. Because of Russia's withdrawal, they were automatically ranked last place and were relegated to the B-division for the next championship.

Group A

Group B

Final stage

Statistics

Top scorers

All-star team
The inclusion of Laura Tomatis and Regula Kindhauser made them the first non-Nordic players to be included in the world championship history.

Goalkeeper: 
Defender: 
Defender: 
Centre: 
Forward: 
Forward: 

MVP:

Division B

Results

Statistics

Top scorers

Final rankings

Division  A

*Because of their withdrawal, Russia were relegated to division B for 2001.

Division  B

*Austria is promoted to division A for 2001.

See also
IFF  Tournament Site

1999 Womens
Floorball, World Championships
Women's World Championships
Women's World Championships,1999
Sport in Borlänge
Sports competitions in Dalarna County
May 1999 sports events in Europe